Kapileswarapuram Mandal is one of the 22 mandals in Konaseema district of Andhra Pradesh. As per census 2011, there are 15 villages.

Demographics 
Kapileswarapuram Mandal has total population of 66,809 as per the Census 2011 out of which 33,583 are males while 33,226 are females and the Average Sex Ratio of Kapileswarapuram Mandal is 989. The total literacy rate of Kapileswarapuram Mandal is 68.22%. The male literacy rate is 63.17% and the female literacy rate is 59.75%.

Towns and villages

Villages 

Addankivari Lanka
Angara
Kaleru
Kapileswarapuram
Korumilli
Machara
Nalluru
Nelaturu
Nidasanametta
Padamati Khandrika
Teki
Thatapudi
Vadlamuru
Vakatippa
Valluru
Vedurumudi

See also 
List of mandals in Andhra Pradesh

References 

Mandals in Konaseema district
Mandals in Andhra Pradesh